This is a list of stadiums that currently serve as the home venue for NCAA Division I college baseball teams. Conference affiliations reflect those in the coming 2023 NCAA baseball season.  In addition, venues which are not located on campus or are used infrequently during the season have been listed. Among Division I conferences that sponsor men's and women's basketball, the Big Sky Conference and Mid-Eastern Athletic Conference are the only ones that do not sponsor baseball.

Current stadiums

Additional stadiums

Future stadiums
This list is intended to include the following:
 Stadiums being built by current Division I members.
 Existing facilities of schools that have announced the addition of baseball or a transition to NCAA Division I.
Conference alignments reflect those expected to be in place at the stadium's opening or the school's entry into Division I play, as applicable. Years of joining a conference reflect baseball seasons, which take place in the calendar year after a school actually joins a conference.

Notes

References

Baseball Venues
 
NCAA Division I Baseball
Baseball
Venues